The Parliamentary Committee of the Trades Union Congress was the leading body of the British trade union movement from 1871 until 1921.

History
The Trades Union Congress (TUC) was established in 1868 and formed a committee to act on its decisions and direct activities between conferences.  Initially, this was an informal body, and the leading role in the movement was taken by the unelected "Junta", with limited backing from their Conference of Amalgamated Trades.  In 1871, they decided to dissolve their organisation and throw their support behind the TUC.

Now occupying the leading position in the British trade union movement, the TUC decided to formalise its activities.  Its committee was re-established as the "Parliamentary Committee", indicating that, at that time, the TUC was focused on lobbying the Parliament of the United Kingdom to enact new legislation favourable to workers, and to ensure that current legislation was enforced.

Trade union membership grew rapidly during the life of the committee, and it was enlarged on several occasions, settling for a time at 12 members, then reaching a maximum of 16.  After a rail strike in 1919 was resolved by mediation, Ernest Bevin proposed that the TUC should take on a mediation role throughout the movement.  A committee investigated the proposal, and concurred, but argued that the Parliamentary Committee could not take on the work, as it was under-resourced and insufficiently representative.  In 1921, it was replaced by the General Council of the TUC, an enlarged body which employed full-time members of staff.

Members
A full list of members is available in the Trades Union Congress's Report of the 1921 Annual Trades Union Congress.  Additional details are from W. J. Davis, History of the British Trades Union Congress.

1868 to 1871
There were six members of the informal committee which existed until 1871:

In 1871, an exploratory Parliamentary Committee was created with five members.

1872 to 1906
The Parliamentary Committee was firmly established at the 1872 Congress, with nine members, although William Allan was given an additional place for the first year.

1907 to 1916
The committee was restructured at the 1907 Congress, sixteen members being elected.  Eleven were elected from trade groups, and five from a "miscellaneous trades" group.  Additionally, the secretary was elected separately.  Davis continued to serve as treasurer for three more years before the post was abolished.  Since 1900, the chairman had gone on to become president at the annual congress, and this practice was continued.

After only one year, the Engineers group was abolished, its seat given to the Miscellaneous Trades group, and most of the other groups were renumbered.

The groups were as follows:

The members in this period were:

1916 to 1921
From 1916, the trade groups were no longer used for elections.  The council was enlarged to seventeen members plus the secretary.  In 1919, it was cut back again to sixteen members.

References

1871 establishments in the United Kingdom
1921 disestablishments in the United Kingdom
British trade unions history
Trades Union Congress